Pseudocuma is a genus of cumaceans, including the following species:
Pseudocuma cercarioides Sars, 1894
Pseudocuma chevreuxi Fage, 1928
Pseudocuma ciliatum Sars, 1879
Pseudocuma diastyloides Sars, 1897
Pseudocuma gracile Sars, 1894
Pseudocuma graciloides Sars, 1894
Pseudocuma laeve Sars, 1914
Pseudocuma lagunae Baker, 1912
Pseudocuma longicorne (Bate, 1858)
Pseudocuma simile G. O. Sars, 1900
Pseudocuma tenuicauda Sars, 1894

References

Cumacea